ONX may refer to:

 Enrique Adolfo Jiménez Airport (IATA: ONX) in Colón, Panama
 Currituck County Regional Airport (FAA: ONX) in Currituck County, North Carolina, United States